Linkwater is a locality in the Marlborough region of New Zealand. Queen Charlotte Drive, the direct route between Havelock to the west and Picton to the east, passes through it. Kenepuru Sound lies to the north and northeast.

History
Linkwater started as a milling town in 1861 due to a stand of kahikatea trees in the area and its proximity to the Marlborough Sounds. When gold was discovered in 1864 at Hall's Creek, the town expanded with three hotels opening. The gold rush resulted in the foundation of Cullensville a few km to the south of Linkwater. Cullensville remains as a ghost town, although the gold was gone by 1867. The last mill closed in the early 1870s.

Dairy farming became the mainstay of the area. The Linkwater Co-operative Dairy Factory was established in 1911, and produced milk, cream and cheese until 1953. Dairy farming is still a major component of the economy, but deer farming and forestry are also important.

Education
Linkwater School is a coeducational full primary (years 1-8) school with a decile rating of 8 and a roll of 44. In 2007, the school celebrated 100 years of education in Linkwater and the surrounding area.

References

External links

 Linkwater School website

Populated places in the Marlborough Region
Populated places in the Marlborough Sounds